Mud Lake Wildlife Management Area at  is an Idaho wildlife management area in Jefferson County north of the town of Mud Lake. Land acquisition for the WMA began in 1940, and the most recent acquisition was in 1969. 

In March and early April up to 50,000 snow geese settle on the lake, along with other waterfowl, including trumpeter swans.

References

Protected areas established in 1940
Protected areas of Jefferson County, Idaho
Wildlife management areas of Idaho
1940 establishments in Idaho